O' God, the Aftermath is the second album released by American metalcore band Norma Jean and was released on March 1, 2005. Like their previous album Bless the Martyr and Kiss the Child, O God, the Aftermath was released on Solid State Records. This is the first album with vocalist Cory Brandan.

Background
The album was re-released on March 21, 2006, as a CD/DVD with expanded Grammy-nominated artwork, two hours of extra footage, and "ShaunLuu" as bonus track which was also featured on the Masters of Horror soundtrack. This track was originally set to be 7 minutes long, but had to be cut short for the soundtrack. On the re-release, on a CD player, if rewind is held down until the display reads -2:20, there is a hidden instrumental song.

Music videos were filmed for the songs "Bayonetwork: Vultures in Vivid Color", "Liarsenic: Creating a Universe of Discourse" and "Absentimental: Street Clam".

The track "Pretendeavor: In Reference to a Sinking Ship" was previously released on a Solid State Records sampler called This Is Solid State: Vol. 5 under the name "In Reference to a Sinking Ship", and was the first recorded output with new vocalist Cory Brandan. It was re-recorded with new parts and riffs for the album.

The song "Absentimental: Street Clam" was previously known as "Manipulateral: Street Clam".

In the liner notes of the original release of the album the full title of the album is listed as "O'God, The Aftermath: The Marvelous End of the Exhausted Contender".

All song titles are portmanteaux.

The words featured on the cover of the CD are the lyrics to the song Coffinspire: Multitude, Multitudes In the Valley of Decision, which is a verse from the Bible.

Track listing

Awards
In 2006, the album was nominated for a Dove Award for Recorded Music Packaging of the Year at the 37th GMA Dove Awards.
In the same year, the album was nominated for a Grammy Award for Best Recording Package at the 48th Annual Grammy Awards.

Personnel
Norma Jean
 Cory Brandan – vocals, guitars
 Scottie H. Henry – guitars
 Chris John Day – guitars
 Jake Schultz – bass
 Daniel Davison – drums

Additional personnel
 Justin Armstrong – Mixing assistant, sampling
 Matt Bayles – Engineer, mixing, producer
 John Daley – Management
 Jeff Gros – Photography
 Alex Rose – Assistant
 Tim Smith – Management
 Howie Weinberg – Mastering

References

Norma Jean (band) albums
2005 albums
Tooth & Nail Records albums
Albums produced by Matt Bayles
Solid State Records albums